Nizamabad, Nezamabad, or Nazmabad, may refer to:

India
 Nizamabad, Telangana, a city in Telangana, India
 Nizamabad Airport, the city's airport
Nizamabad Municipal Corporation, the city's governing body
 Nizamabad mandal, a mandal in Telangana, India
 Nizamabad district, a district in Telangana, India
 Nizamabad (Lok Sabha constituency), an Indian parliamentary constituency in Telangana
 Nizamabad, Uttar Pradesh, a town in Azamgarh district, Uttar Pradesh, India

Iran

Fars Province
 Nezamabad, Arsanjan, a village in Arsanajan County
 Nezamabad, Darab, a village in Darab County
 Nezamabad, Eqlid, a village in Eqlid County
 Nezamabad, Fasa, a village in Fasa County
 Nezamabad, Jahrom, a village in Jahrom County
 Nezamabad, Kazerun, a village in Kazerun County

Golestan Province
 Nizamabad, Golestan, a city in Golestan Province, Iran
 Nezamabad Rural District, in Golestan Province

Hamadan Province
 Nezamabad, Hamadan, a city in Hamadan Province, Iran

Hormozgan Province
 Nizamabad, Hormozgan, a village in Hormozgan Province, Iran

Isfahan Province

Kerman Province
 Nizamabad, Kerman, a city in Kerman Province, Iran
 Nazmabad, Anbarabad, a village in Kerman Province, Iran
 Nezamabad, Bardsir, a village in Kerman Province, Iran
 Nazmabad, Rafsanjan, a village in Kerman Province, Iran
 Nazmabad, Rudbar-e Jonubi, a village in Kerman Province, Iran

Kermanshah Province
Nezamabad, Kermanshah, a village in Kermanshah County

Markazi Province
 Nazmabad, Markazi, a village in Markazi Province, Iran
 Nezamabad, Markazi, a village in Markazi Province, Iran
 Nezamabad, Shazand, a village in Markazi Province, Iran

Mazandaran Province
Nezamabad, Mazandaran, a village in Amol County

Qazvin Province
 Nezamabad, Qazvin, a village in Qazvin Province, Iran

Razavi Khorasan Province
 Nezamabad, Razavi Khorasan, a village in Razavi Khorasan Province, Iran

Tehran Province
 Nezamabad, Tehran, a village in Tehran Province, Iran

West Azerbaijan Province
 Nezamabad, Miandoab, a village in Miandoab County
 Nezamabad, Naqadeh, a village in Naqadeh County

Zanjan Province
 Nezamabad, Zanjan, a village in Zanjan County

Pakistan
 Nizamabad, Pakistan, a small town in Gujranwala District, Punjab, Pakistan

See also
 Nazemabad (disambiguation)
 Nazimabad